Beginning in 2013, Amazon started distributing original content (series, films, etc.) through its Prime Video service, some of which are developed by in-house Amazon Studios. This article gives a list of Amazon's originals for India.

TV shows

Drama

Comedy

Animation

Documentary

Films
The following film was released under Amazon Original Movie or (in case for skipping theatrical releases) Amazon Presents.

Reality/stand-up comedies

See also
List of Netflix India originals
List of Disney+ Hotstar original programming
List of SonyLIV original programming
List of ZEE5 original programming

References

Notes 

Amazon
Amazon
Amazon (company)